Manon Lescaut is a 1926 silent German feature film based on the oft-filmed novel by Abbe Prevost. It stars Lya De Putti and was directed by Arthur Robison. It was produced and distributed by renowned German film company Universum Film AG better known as UFA. A young actress named Marlene Dietrich had a supporting role in this production. A set decorator on this film was the soon to be American Expatriate Paul Leni, who would find great success as a director in Hollywood. It was shot at the Babelsberg and Tempelhof Studios, both of which were controlled by UFA.

In 1927, an American version was made, When a Man Loves.

Plot 
A French adventurer studying for the priesthood fights to save a woman in the life of prostitution.

Cast
Lya De Putti as Manon Lescaut
Vladimir Gajdarov as Des Grieux
Eduard Rothauser as Marschall des Grieux
Fritz Greiner as Marquis de Bli
Hubert von Meyerinck as Der Jung de Bli
Frida Richard as Manons Tante
Emilie Kurz as Manons Tante
Lydia Potechina as Susanne
Theodor Loos as Tiberge
Sig Arno as Lescaut
Trude Hesterberg as Claire 
Marlene Dietrich as Micheline
Olga Engl 
Karl Harbacher 
Hans Junkermann 
Hermann Picha

References

External links

Manon Lescaut; allmovie.com

1926 films
German black-and-white films
1926 romantic drama films
German silent feature films
Films of the Weimar Republic
Films directed by Arthur Robison
Films based on French novels
Films based on romance novels
Films based on works by Antoine François Prévost
Films set in the 1720s
Films set in the 1730s
Films produced by Erich Pommer
UFA GmbH films
German historical romance films
1920s historical romance films
Films shot at Babelsberg Studios
Films shot at Tempelhof Studios
German romantic drama films
Silent romantic drama films
1920s German films
Silent historical romance films